Indira Kanwar ( 1696 – 1763) was the second wife of Emperor Farrukhsiyar. The marriage of Indira Kanwar to Farrukhsiyar made him the last Mughal sovereign to marry a Rajput princess. She left the imperial harem after her husband's death and returned to her father's household. She converted back to Hinduism before her death.

She was born as Marwar Princess (Rajkumari), the daughter of Ajit Singh and his first wife Rani Udot Kanwarji, the daughter of Maharaj Shri Gaj Singh Sahib. She was the sister of Bakht Singh and Abhai Singh, the next rulers of Jodhpur State.

Family
Indira Kanwar was born in 1696 as Maharajkumari Shri Indira Kanwar Baiji Lall Sahiba, the daughter of Ajit Singh, the Maharaja of Marwar (later Jodhpur) state in the present-day Rajasthan. Her mother was Shri Rani Udot Kanwarji Maji Sahiba (Amolak de Ranawat), daughter of Maharaj Shri Gaj Singh Sahib, the brother of Maharana Shri Jai Singh, Maharana of Mewar. She was the grand daughter of Maharaja Jaswant Singh. She was also related to Taj Bibi Bilqis Makani, daughter of Raja Udai Singh, the wife of Mughal Emperor Jahangir and the mother of the next Mughal Emperor Shah Jahan. She was the sister of Bakht Singh and Abhai Singh, the next rulers of Jodhpur State.

Marriage
When Ajit Singh had expelled the imperial officers from his state during the wars of succession, and had captured Ajmer. Husain Ali Khan was sent against him, but the emperor, at the instance of his favourites, who were hostile to the Sayyids, secretly encouraged Ajit Singh to resist the imperial troops. His resistance was, however, of no avail. Husain Ali overran Jodhpur, and Ajit Singh was obliged to submit, to send his son Abhay Singh to court, and offer a daughter in marriage to Farrukhsiyar. Owing to his anxiety to return at once to Court, Husain Ali Khan had not been able to wait in Rajputana, until Rajah Ajit Singh had finished the necessary preparations for the dispatch of his daughter to Delhi. When the dispute with the Sayyids had been allayed and Husain Ali Khan had taken his departure to the Dakhin, Shaista Khan, the Emperor's maternal uncle, was sent on 15 May 1715 to bring the bride from her home at Jodhpur. He arrived with her at Delhi on 23 September 1715, and tents were erected within the palace for her reception. She was then sent to the mansion of Amir-ul-umara, and the preparations for the wedding were made over to Qutb-ul-mulk. Four days afterwards the Emperor repaired to the mansion of Amir-ul-umara, and there on repetition of the creed, the lady was admitted into the Muhammadan faith. The same night the marriage rite was performed by Shariyat Khan, the chief Qazi, one lakh of gold coins being entered in the deed as her dower. The nobles presented their congratulations, and the Qazi received a present of Rs. 2,000.

The bridegroom's gifts to the bride were provided on a regal scale by the Emperor's mother, Sahiba-i-Niswan Begum, and sent to the bride's quarters on 11 December 1715, accompanied by many nobles, who were entertained by Qutb-ul-mulk. On the 16th the ceremony of applying henna to the bridegroom's hands and feet was carried out, and the persons who brought it were entertained in the usual way. On 17 December 1715, the whole of the Diwan-i-am and the courtyard, both sides of the road within the palace, and the plain towards the Jamuna were illuminated by lamps placed on bamboo screens. In the evening, Farrukhsiyar came out by the Delhi Gate of the palace, seated on a movable throne and wearing, according to usage, the clothes sent to him by the bride's father, of which Khemsi Bhandari had been the bearer. The Emperor was preceded by platforms, on which stood women singing and dancing as they were carried along. Fireworks were let off. The Emperor entered the house of Amir-ul-umara and there completed the usual ceremonies. Those observed on this occasion were a mixture of Muhammadan and Hindu usages. One which caused much remark was the offer to the guest of a drink made of rose-water, sugar, and opium. This mixture was pressed on them by the Rajputs on the plea that it was the custom of their country. Many Muhammadans drank of it, but some objected. There was another thing never seen before in an imperial wedding. A gold plate had been made with five divisions, and each of these divisions was filled with precious stones. In one, diamonds; in another, rubies; in the third, emeralds  in the fourth, topazes; and in the fifth, which was in the center of them all, large and valuable pearls. Farrukhsiyar returned late at night, bringing the bride with him to the palace, which he entered by the Lahore Gate, it being unlucky to go and come by the same route. The festivities continued to the end of the month.

Restoration
At the time of setting out from Delhi, Ajit Singh had been appointed to command the vanguard. Thereupon he commenced to make excuses, on the ground that if he left his daughter, Indira Kunwar, behind him, she would either poison herself or her name and fame would be assailed. Yielding to these pleas, Abdullah Khan made the lady over to her father. She performed a ceremony of purification in the Hindu fashion, and gave up her Muhammadan attire. Then, with all her property, estimated to exceed 1,00,00,000 Rupees (£1,000,000) in value, she was sent off to her native country of Jodhpur. Great indignation was felt by the Muhammadans, especially by the more bigoted class of those learned in the law. The Qazi issued a ruling that the giving back of a convert was entirely opposed to Muhammadan law. But, in spite of this opposition, Abdullah Khan insisted on conciliating Ajit Singh, although on no previous occasion had a Rajput Princess been restored to her own people after she had once entered the imperial harem.

Ancestry

References

External links
 Indira Kanwar and the Road to Ayodhya

1696 births
1763 deaths
People from Jodhpur
17th-century Indian women
17th-century Indian people
Indian princesses 
Mughal royal consorts 
Rajput princesses